Sofinnova is the name shared by two venture capital firms, Sofinnova Partners and Sofinnova Ventures.  The name Sofinnova is a contraction of the French, "Société de Financement de l’Innovation" or, Innovation Venture Capital Company.  Both firms trace their roots back to Sofinnova SA, an investment institution founded in Paris in 1972.  The two firms have raised ~$4B since inception and have generally shared a similar investment strategy of financing projects and ideas in the life sciences and technology sectors.  The two firms distinguish themselves on the basis of their target geographies, stage of investment, and sectors. They have been independent entities since 1997.

 Sofinnova Partners is based in Paris, London, and Milan and focuses primarily on European biotech, medtech, biopharma, and industrial biotech investments, with a similar allocation for the US.
 Sofinnova Ventures has offices in Menlo Park, CA, and San Diego, CA, and focuses largely on US biotech investments, with ~20% allocation for Europe.

Sofinnova Partners and Sofinnova Ventures have historically shared some of the same Limited Partners, and have co-invested together in various life sciences companies including Flamel, Cerep, Genset, Actelion, Preglem, Movetis, Ascendis, Obseva, Auris and Nucana.  The firms have a collegial relationship and exchange information and due diligence. The firms do not have an obligation to disclose deals or to co-invest, but historically have co-invested together in ~10% of their collective investments.

Sofinnova Partners (France, UK, Italy)

Sofinnova Partners is an independent venture capital firm based in Paris, London, and Milan with approximately €2 billion of capital. The firm invests primarily in early-stage companies and corporate spin-offs, in industrial biotechnology and in life sciences.

The Sofinnova Partners' flagship fund, Sofinnova Capital IX, raised €333M in 2019.

Over the last few years, Sofinnova Partners has created a platform strategy to include multiple funds alongside its historic Capital Fund. This includes:
 The Sofinnova Telethon Fund, specializing in early‐stage investments in gene and cell therapies
 The Sofinnova Crossover I, a fund investing in pre‐ and post‐IPO companies
 The Sofinnova MD Start III, a medical device acceleration fund
 The Sofinnova Industrial Biotech I

Each of these funds is managed by dedicated specialist teams and are unique investment vehicles across the life sciences investment value chain.

Sofinnova has financed over 500 companies around the world since its inception in 1972 of which more than 20% have successfully completed an initial public offering and more than 20% have been acquired by strategic buyers.

Investments
Sofinnova Partners most recently closed its Sofinnova Telethon Fund at €108 M and has invested in 3 Italian biotech startups in the last 6 months. This fund specializes in early‐stage investments in gene and cell therapies and is based out of Milan, Italy. It also completed fundraising for its ninth private equity fund, Sofinnova Capital IX with €333M raised.

Some notable investments from the firm's flagship fund include Innate, Maximiles and NovusPharma from Sofinnova Capital III (€121M). Sofinnova Partners' Capital IV fund, which raised €330M of capital, made it one of the largest venture firms in Europe at the time.  In 2005, Sofinnova Partners was named “Fund of the Year” by Private Equity International and “VC Techno House of the Year 2005” by the European Venture Capital Journal (EVCJ) which described Sofinnova's fundraising as the “Fundraising of the Year 2005”.  This fund invested in a number of companies including Taptu.  Sofinnova Partners has raised several venture capital funds (see Table).

Source: Private Equity Intelligence and Sofinnova

Sofinnova Ventures (USA)

Sofinnova Ventures is an independent venture capital firm based in Menlo Park.

Investments
Sofinnova Ventures has been an active venture investor, investing in some well-known venture investments of the period.  Sofinnova Ventures has backed companies including: Millennium Pharmaceuticals, Kosan Biosciences, Actelion, Intermune, Seattle Genetics, Cotherix, Threshold Pharmaceuticals, Prestwick, Preglem, Movetis, Intellikine, Amarin Corporation, Salveo, and Labrys.

The San Francisco office of Sofinnova Ventures was often remembered for having an original 18 ft. mosasaurus in the office of one of the Managing Partners (Mike Powell).  Sofinnova Ventures closed their San Francisco office in 2011, and combined their Bay Area offices into a single office on Sand Hill Road in Menlo Park.

Sofinnova Ventures has raised several venture capital funds (see Table).  The earlier funds, SVP I through V, were predominantly information technology (IT), wherein the later funds were predominantly life science focused.  SVP VIII and IX were exclusively life science only, with emphasis on Phase 2 and 3 drug development.  SVP IV was Sofinnova Ventures' initial fund after the reorganization of Sofinnova in 1997.  Each of the funds from SVP V through SVP IX exceeded the target raise, and closed at the maximum amount as allowed by the Limited Partner agreements.

Source: Private Equity Intelligence and Sofinnova.

History

1970s:  The Founding of Sofinnova

 1972 - Sofinnova was founded with the backing of several French financial institutions (most notably Crédit National) and was notable at the time for creating the first "American style" venture capital firm in France.  Peter Brooke, the founder of TA Associates, was a board member of Sofinnova SA in its early years. Sofinnova SA quickly established a presence in the European market through the formation of Sofinnova Partners in Paris. Sofinnova SA owned this firm from 1972 until 1997.
 1974 - Sofinnova became the first European venture company to enter the US market launching its US affiliate, Sofinnova, Inc (Sofinnova Ventures).  Sofinnova co-founder, Jean Deleage, who would later co-found US venture firm Burr, Egan, Deleage & Co., was appointed the head of the US operation.  Sofinnova's US business gained attention for its role as an early backer of Tandem Computers and Genentech in the early 1980s.
 1976 - Sofinnova co-founder Jean Deleage established the American subsidiary of Sofinnova, called Sofinnova, Inc., in San Francisco, which eventually became Sofinnova Ventures.  Deleage departed Sofinnova in 1979 to co-found another venture capital firm Burr, Egan, Deleage & Co.  In 1981, working with Deleage, Sofinnova developed a partnership with Burr, Egan, Deleage & Co. and ultimately other US firms.  Jean-Bernard Schmidt, who would later serve as Chairman of Sofinnova, was named the head of US operations of Sofinnova, Inc.

1980s:  The Early Growth of Sofinnova

 1985 - Sofinnova completed an initial public offering with a listing on the Paris Stock Exchange.
 1987 - Alain Azan moved to San Francisco to take over management of Sofinnova Ventures, replacing Jean-Bernard Schmidt. Schmidt would be named Chairman of Sofinnova, retaining that position through 2007. Sofinnova Ventures completed fundraising for SVP I, which was a private equity fund originally intended to invest in European companies expanding in the US. Ultimately, Sofinnova Venture Partners would shift its focus toward investments in domestic US companies.
 1989 - Sofinnova Partners completed fundraising for Sofinnova Capital, its first private equity fund in France, with €38M of investor commitments. Sofinnova's investments in this fund include Genset Corporation as well as Cerep, Egide and Flamel.

1990s:  The Reorganization of Sofinnova into Sofinnova Partners and Sofinnova Ventures

 1993 - Sofinnova delisted itself from the Paris exchange to raise capital privately through traditional private equity funds. Prior to the 1997 reorganization, Sofinnova Ventures raised three venture funds totaling $57M, and Sofinnova Partners raised funds with €85M in commitments.
 1997 - The global Sofinnova organization restructured, formally creating two separate management companies, one for Sofinnova Ventures, and one for Sofinnova Partners.  The reorganization was done on the basis of geography, creating Sofinnova Ventures in the US and Sofinnova Partners in Europe.  Following a management buyout, each of the management companies was solely owned by its respective management teams.

2000s:  The Move to Life Science for Sofinnova

 2000 - Sofinnova Ventures hires Jim Healy, MD, PhD and together he and Mike Powell, PhD rebuilt the Sofinnova Ventures LS brand, with focus on clinical stage drug development companies.  
 2003 - Sofinnova Ventures started its EIR/Executive Partner program in Life Sciences, with its first EIR Barry Selick.  Following this, several other EIRs/Executive Partners joined Sofinnova Ventures from then until 2015, including: Jeff Stein, David Kabakoff, Bill Ringo (Strategic Advisor), Goro Takeda, Jay Shepard, George Horner, Lars Ekman and Dan Welch. 
 2006 - Sofinnova Ventures and Sofinnova Partners first sponsored the Sofinnova Biopharm Partnering Conference in Japan, headed up by Sofinnova's Goro Takeda.  In 2014, the conference teamed up with Biotechnology Industry Organization, making this the largest biopartnering meeting in Japan.
 2007 - SVP VII was raised, which was Sofinnova Ventures' first fund that was overwhelmingly focused on Life Science (80%+), with emphasis on drug development.  Their next fund, SVP VIII in 2011 was exclusively (100%) Life Science.  At the same time, Sofinnova Partners in Paris moved from a balanced IT/LS venture firm, to one that was predominantly focused on Life Science.  
 2008 - Sofinnova Ventures made its last IT investment (Enovix).  The remaining IT team was active for several years after this to monitor and monetize the final IT investments.

2010s:  New Growth Initiatives at Sofinnova

 2010 - Sofinnova Partners started their Green Seed Fund and hired Joško Bobanović to manage this new initiative.  In 2012, this seed fund initiative was announced in conjunction with the Sofinnova Capital VII announcement.  
 2013 - Sofinnova Ventures worked with General Partner Garheng Kong to spin out a new fund, called HealthQuest Capital.  HQC's mandate is to provide growth capital to companies transforming healthcare, with a focus on companies other than drug development.  HQC raised their second fund, at $225M, in 2016, and transitioned to further independence from the parent Sofinnova Ventures organization.
 2017 - Sofinnova Partners announced the first closing of Sofinnova Industrial Biotech I, at €106 million. The fund, dedicated to renewable chemistry, follows a series of 9 investments in the sector since 2009.

References

Done Deals: Venture Capitalists Tell Their Stories, 2000. p. 249-250
 The New Venturers: Inside the High-stakes World of Venture Capital, 1985. p. 117
Sofinnova SA Public Repurchase offering (French)

Sofinnova Partners

Accent to Expand with Investment from Sofinnova Partners

Sofinnova Ventures

Sofinnova Ventures.  Business Week Profile.
DISTILLATIONS, University of Toronto

External links
Sofinnova Ventures (US) - company website
Sofinnova Partners (France) - company website

Financial services companies established in 1972
Companies based in San Francisco
Venture capital firms of the United States
Life sciences industry
French companies established in 1972